Maria Mateaș (born 21 July 1999) is a Romanian-American tennis player.

Mateas has a career-high WTA singles ranking of 284, achieved on 13 August 2018. She made her WTA Tour main-draw debut at the 2016 Bank of the West Classic, having received a wildcard into the singles tournament.

On the ITF Junior Circuit, Mateas has a career-high combined ranking of 26, achieved in April 2016.

ITF Circuit finals

Singles

Doubles: 3 (1 title, 2 runner-ups)

References

External links
 
 
 Duke Athletics bio

1999 births
Living people
American female tennis players
Duke Blue Devils women's tennis players
Romanian emigrants to the United States
Sportspeople from Braintree, Massachusetts